Xu Cheng (born 5 May 1991) is a Chinese freestyle wrestler. She won the bronze medal in the 48 kg division at the 2013 World Wrestling Championships.

References

1991 births
Living people
Chinese female sport wrestlers
World Wrestling Championships medalists
21st-century Chinese women